Eva Schute (born 4 January 1964) is a German footballer. She played in four matches for the Germany women's national football team in 1984.

References

External links
 

1964 births
Living people
German women's footballers
Germany women's international footballers
Place of birth missing (living people)
Women's association footballers not categorized by position